Esslingen may refer to:

Places
 Esslingen (district), a district (Landkreis) of Baden-Württemberg in southern Germany
 Esslingen am Neckar, capital city of the district of Esslingen
 Esslingen, Switzerland, a village in Switzerland
 Eßlingen, a municipality in western Germany

Other
 Maschinenfabrik Esslingen, a former locomotive manufacturing company based in Esslingen am Neckar

See also 
 Esslinger (disambiguation)